Assumption Island is a small island in the Outer Islands of Seychelles north of Madagascar,  south-west of the capital, Victoria, on Mahé Island.
In 2018, Seychelles and India signed an agreement to build and operate a joint military facility on a portion of the island, which the National Assembly of Seychelles refuted the agreement and deemed after protestation by the citizens of Seychelles.
As protests continued, the Seychellois president endorsed the Assumption Island deal with India.  The plan caused public protests by activists who believed that the islands should stay out of the brewing India-China regional conflict. The agreement was declared "dead" by the Island's opposition party.

History
Assumption Island was discovered by Captain Nicolas Morphey on 14 August 1756, and was named after the religious feast of the next day. 
In 1908, the island was leased to Mr H. Savy of Mahé, who built a coconut plantation there.
The first settlement was in the northern part of the island.
During a visit two years later, he realized the guano potential of the island. The villagers transferred their labor force to guano mining camp that operated from 1907 until 1983. The camp was the location of the current village. Later, the villagers were employed as fishermen, usually of bêche-de-mer, until it was declared protected. 
In the mid 1960s, the island was proposed as an American military base, including a deep sea port. After strong protests from environmental organizations, this plan was rejected.  
In 1990, the airfield was built.

Geography
Assumption Island is located about 27 km south of Anse Takamaka on Aldabra Atoll and is part of the Aldabra Group.
It is a single coral island  in area. The western shore features an almost uninterrupted sandy beach 5.5 km.
The 5.5 km, white, sandy beach that stretches on the southeastern side of the island has been several times named 'the best beach in the world' for its white sand, crystalline waters, diversity of marine life and lack of crowds.
Due to the disruptive effect of guano mining which lasted until 1983, the island is dominated by expanses of bare rock and caves, and is sparsely covered with low-growing vegetation.

Administration
The island belongs to the  Outer Islands District.

Transport
The island is bisected by a  concrete airfield  running between the two sand dunes on the southeast point to the village on the western coast. The island is occasionally serviced by an Island Development Company (IDC) aircraft from Mahé, usually with scientists which have a boat take them to Aldabra Atoll.
The island has a small port called St. Thomas Anchorage, which is currently enlarged by the Indian Army to a large port.

Joint Military Facility

In 2015, Seychelles and India signed an agreement for constructing and operating joint military facility on the Island. A coast surveillance radar system built by support from India became operational in 2016. A revised agreement was signed in 2018 and the Seychelles President has endorsed its ratification. The Government of India has also stated that this was a joint project on the request of the Seychelles government and would be jointly managed by both countries. India plans to invest $550 million in building the facility. Recently, the deal for an Indian military base in Seychelles was declared as ‘dead’ by the Island's opposition party. The leader of the opposition also clearly stated that this was the end of the ‘assumption agreement’ and no further discussions on India's military base were on the agenda.

Flora and fauna
Assumption Island was once home to a great diversity of seabirds, including the Abbott's booby, which is now confined to a single breeding island: Christmas Island, in the eastern Indian Ocean. Efforts are now underway by the Seychelles Islands Foundation, in conjunction with Island Conservation Society and the Islands Development Company, to restore the habitat of the island. The first successful step in this process was the removal of invasive, introduced bird species, Madagascar fody and red-whiskered bulbul.
A notable feature of this island is the Assumption Island day gecko, a subspecies of gecko found only on this island. An endemic race of souimanga sunbird once bred on the island.
The nature documentary of Jacques-Yves Cousteau and Louis Malle, The Silent World was partially shot on Assumption. The island is known for its rich fish life.

Image gallery

References

External links 

 National Bureau of Statistics
 
 Gallery of Aldabra and Assumption

Coral islands
Islands of Outer Islands (Seychelles)
Indian Naval Air Stations
Indian Navy bases
Indian Air Force bases
Indian Army bases